The Kelly Field Historic District is located in southwestern San Antonio, Bexar County, Texas. It is the center portion of the base, east of the runways. The boundaries of the 1600 buildings are Billy Mitchell Road on the north, Wagner on the east, England on the south and S. Frank Luke Drive on the west. The 1700 block of officer quarters are bounded on the north by Chennault Street, the east and south by Chennault Circle, and Van Nostrand Drive on the west. The historic district contains 58 contributing and non-contributing buildings, structures, objects and sites, and was added to the National Register of Historic Places in 2003.

Camp Kelly was established on May 7, 1917, to be a US Army training facility for pilots and support staff during World War I. The first airplanes arrived on April 5, and on April 6 the United States declared war on Germany. The increased training activities necessitated more facilities and the acquisition of additional land. The original field became Kelly Field No. 1. The new facilities became Kelly Field No. 2. Military cut-backs followed the 1918 Armistice with Germany, and the two facilities ceased training pilots but functioned as supply depots. The two fields were re-designated in 1925 as Duncan Field (Kelly No. 1) and Kelly Field (Kelly No. 2). The latter included the Air Service Advanced Flying School where Charles Lindbergh earned his wings, graduating first in his class on March 14, 1925.

In 1926, the Army Air Corps Act authorized a 5-year period of expansion to begin July 1, 1927. As a result, both Kelly No. 1 and No. 2 began being developed as  permanent aviator training facilities. During World War II, the facilities were consolidated as San Antonio Air Depot and was the largest maintenance and supply facility in the United States.  The property was renamed Kelly Air Force Base after the National Security Act of 1947 established  the United States Air Force as a separate branch of the military. Kelly eventually became the largest employer in San Antonio. In 1995, the United States government began realignment of military facilities. Kelly was closed in 2001, partially combined with Lackland Air Force Base. The remainder was taken over by the Greater Kelly Development Authority of the state of Texas and redeveloped as a commercial and military industrial center.

Properties
The development that began between the two world wars, and continued through post-World War II, is the area designated as Kelly Field Historic District.

National Register criteria for which the following properties qualify are two-fold:
"Property is associated with events that have made a significant contribution to the broad patterns of our history."
"Property embodies the distinct characteristic of a type, period, or method of construction or represents a work of a master, or possesses high artistic values, or represents a significant and distinguishable entity whose components lack individual distinction."

The following data is reproduced from Table 1 of NPS Form 10-900 Registration Form dated April 15, 2002. The dates represent the original construction period and subsequent improvements or other alterations to the property.

Contributing

Non contributing

References

National Register of Historic Places in San Antonio
Works Progress Administration in Texas
Military facilities on the National Register of Historic Places in Texas
Airports on the National Register of Historic Places
Historic districts on the National Register of Historic Places in Texas
1917 establishments in Texas
Transportation buildings and structures on the National Register of Historic Places in Texas
Military in San Antonio